Fengyuan is a railway station in Taichung, Taiwan served by Taiwan Railways. It was formerly a terminus for the now-defunct TRA Dongshi line.

Overview
The 1960 station opened with two island platforms. In 2016 it was converted to one side platform, one island platform, and a remaining unused platform.

As part of the Taichung Elevated Railway Project, the station is slated to be replaced with an elevated station with two island platforms.

History
1905-05-15: Opened as 葫蘆墩駅.
1920: The station name was changed to the current "Fengyuan Station".
1959-01-12: The TRA Dongshi line opened for service, with the station as a terminus.
November 1960: The station was re-constructed as a concrete station building.
1991-09-01: The TRA Dongshi line ceases service.
2008-02-25: The station becomes a stop on the Taroko Express.

Platform layout

Around the station
 Fengyuan Museum of Lacquer Art
 Taichung Municipal City Huludun Cultural Center
 Taiwan Balloons Museum
 Taichung City Government Yangming Building
 National Feng Yuan Commercial High School
 Zhongzheng Rd.
 Sanmin Rd.
 Fengyuan Tzu Chi Temple
 Miaodong Night Market
 Feng Yuan Junior High School
 Taichung Police Department, Fengyuan Branch

See also
 List of railway stations in Taiwan

References

External links

TRA Fengyuan Station 
TRA Fengyuan Station

1905 establishments in Taiwan
Railway stations in Taichung
Railway stations opened in 1905
Railway stations served by Taiwan Railways Administration